Dummy Lake or Lac Dummy may refer to the following Canadian lakes:

 Dummy Lake, Manitoba, now known as Wargatie Lake
 Dummy Lake (Ontario), Kenora District, Ontario
 Lac Dummy, Outaouais, Quebec

See also
 Big Dummy Lake, Barron County, Wisconsin
 Little Dummy Lake, Barron County, Wisconsin